Gil-Pérès, real name Jules-Charles Pérès Jolin, (9 July 1822 – 30 January 1882) was a 19th-century French stage actor and vaudevilliste, who was a member of the troupe of the Théâtre du Palais-Royal in Paris in the mid-19th century, and created several roles in Offenbach operettas.

He was also noted for his collaboration in the plays of Labiche, often as servants.

He was buried in Passy Cemetery, where his epitaph is « le connaître, c’était l’aimer » ("to know him was to love him"); the monument was sculpted by Amédée Donatien Doublemard.

He is portrayed in the 1977 French television series 'Les Folies Offenbach' by Christian Marin.

Some roles 
 1852 (8 May): Les Suites d'un premier lit, one-act comedy mingled with songs by Eugène Labiche, Théâtre du Vaudeville : Piquoiseau
 1854 (9 September) : Le Baiser à l'étrier, vaudeville in one act by Edouard Brisebarre, Eugène Nyon, Théâtre du Palais-Royal
 1857 (26 January) : Le Bras d'Ernest, vaudeville, Théâtre du Palais-Royal : title role
 1860 : Les Trois Fils de Cadet-Roussel by Michel Delaporte, Charles Varin and Paul Laurencin, Théâtre du Palais-Royal
 1861 : La Beauté du diable, vaudeville in 3 acts by Eugène Grangé and Lambert-Thiboust, Théâtre du Palais-Royal : La Roussotte
 1863 (9 May): Le Brésilien, comedy by Henri Meilhac and Ludovic Halévy, Théâtre du Palais-Royal 
 1864 (21 December): Le Photographe, comédie-vaudeville by Henri Meilhac and Ludovic Halévy, Théâtre du Palais-Royal  
 1865 : La Succession Bonnet; comédie-vaudeville, by the duc de Morny, with a rondeau for Gridou (Gil-Pérès) by Offenbach, Corps législatif
 1866 (2 May) : Le Myosotis, vaudeville in one act, by William Busnach, music by Charles Lecocq, Théâtre du Palais-Royal : Cornillon
 1866 (31 October): La Vie parisienne, opéra-bouffe by Jacques Offenbach, libretto by Henri Meilhac and Ludovic Halévy, Théâtre du Palais-Royal: Bobinet
 1868 (6 May): Le château à Toto, opéra bouffe in three acts, music by Offenbach, libretto by  Henri Meilhac and Ludovic Halevy, Théâtre du Palais-Royal: Le Baron de Crécy-Crécy
 1874 (2 April) : Le Homard, vaudeville in one act, by Edmond Gondinet Théâtre du Palais-Royal : Romanèche
 1874 (24 November) : La Boule, comédie in four acts, by Henry Meilhac and Ludovic Halevy, Théâtre du Palais-Royal : La Musardière

References 

Male actors from Paris
19th-century French male actors
French male stage actors
1822 births
1882 deaths
Burials at Passy Cemetery